Tao Te-san (born 24 August 1955), better known by his pen name Kuo Cheng, is a Taiwanese fiction writer. He is perhaps best known for writing the screenplays of several films directed by Ho Ping and Kevin Chu.

His older brother Tao Te-chen (陶德辰) was a filmmaker-actor in the 1980s. Their family originated in Huanggang, Hubei, China.

Works

"The Journey of the Wolf" was one of the stories Kuo used when he and director Ho Ping wrote the screenplay for Ho's 1997 film Wolves Cry Under the Moon.

Filmography

Films

TV Dramas (incomplete)

Film awards

References

External links

1955 births
Taiwanese screenwriters
Writers from Taipei
Taiwanese male short story writers
Living people
20th-century Taiwanese short story writers
20th-century male writers
21st-century Taiwanese short story writers
21st-century male writers
Aletheia University alumni